Štadión Lokomotívy v Čermeli is a multi-purpose stadium in Košice, Slovakia.  It is currently used mostly for football matches and it was the home ground of FC Kosice. The stadium is still contracted with FC Košice, women categories are playing there. The stadium holds 9000 people and was built in 1970.

History 

The stadium is in the Čermeľ district, a multi-use stadium in Košice, Slovakia. It is currently used mostly for football matches as the home ground of VSS Košice since 1997. The stadium holds 10,787 (8,787 seated) spectators and was built in 1970. Initially, the stadium was used by Lokomotíva Košice and 1.FC Košice (now VSS) have played there since 1997 until last year. The Slovakia national football team played there a few matches, but the stadium does not meet UEFA criteria for international events today. The club planned the construction of a new stadium for 20,000 spectators in the neighbourhood of the old, disused Všešportový areál stadium. The estimated cost of the stadium is €28 million. However, the construction was not launched and it is not clear when it starts.

Photo gallery

International matches
Lokomotíva stadium has hosted one friendly and one competitive match of the Slovakia national football team.

Concerts

List of concerts

External links
Stadium Database Article

References 

Football venues in Slovakia
Football venues in Czechoslovakia
Athletics (track and field) venues in Czechoslovakia
Multi-purpose stadiums in Slovakia
Stadium
Buildings and structures in Košice
Sports venues completed in 1970